The 2014–15 Lipscomb Bisons women's basketball team will represent Lipscomb University in the 2014–15 NCAA Division I women's basketball season. The Lady Bisons were coached by third year head coach Greg Brown and were a member of the Atlantic Sun Conference. They finished the season 8-21, 3-11 in A-Sun play for a seventh-place finish. They lost in the quarterfinals of the 2015 Atlantic Sun women's basketball tournament to Stetson.

Media
All home games and conference road will be shown on ESPN3 or A-Sun.TV. Non conference road games will typically be available on the opponents website.

Roster

Schedule

|-
!colspan=9 style="background:#F4AA00;"|Exhibition

|-
!colspan=9 style="background:#331E54; color:#F4AA00;"|Regular Season

|-
!colspan=9 style="background:#F4AA00;"|2015 Atlantic Sun Tournament

References

Lipscomb
Lipscomb Bisons women's basketball seasons